Dewan Shamsul Abedin is a Bangladeshi politician. He is the descendant of the Hason Raja (ex-grandson). From Sunamganj-3 constituency, he was elected Member of Parliament for Bangladesh Nationalist Party in the Second National Parliament Election of 1979.

Birth and early life 
Dewan Shamsul Abedin was born in Sunamganj district of Sylhet division.

Political life 
Dewan Shamsul Abedin is a leader of the Bangladesh Nationalist Party. From Sunamganj-3 constituency, he was elected Member of Parliament for Bangladesh Nationalist Party in the Second National Parliament Election of 1979.

See also 

 Sunamganj-3
 1979 Bangladeshi general election

References

External links 
 List of 2nd Parliament Members- Jatiya Sangsad

Living people
People from Sunamganj District
2nd Jatiya Sangsad members
Bangladesh Nationalist Party politicians
Year of birth missing (living people)